The Gnome 7 Lambda was a French designed, seven-cylinder, air-cooled rotary aero engine that was produced under license in Britain and Germany. Powering several World War I-era aircraft types it was claimed to produce  from its capacity of  although recorded figures are lower.

Just under 1,000 units were produced in Britain, the majority (967) by the Daimler Company of Coventry. A 14-cylinder variant was known as the Gnome 14 Lambda-Lambda.

In Germany Motorenfabrik Oberursel license-built the seven-cylinder engine as the Oberursel U.0 and later copied the 14-cylinder design and designated it as the Oberursel U.III.

Variants
Gnome 7 Lambda
Seven-cylinder, single-row rotary engine. 
Gnome 7 Lambda (long stroke)
Gnome 14 Double Lambda 
14-cylinder, two-row rotary engine using Lambda cylinders. .
Motorenfabrik Oberursel U.0
Motorenfabrik Oberursel U.III :German production of the Gnome 14 Double Lambda

Applications
List from Lumsden

Gnome 7 Lambda

Avro 504
Blackburn Type I
Borel hydro-monoplane
Blériot Parasol
Blériot XI
Bristol Boxkite
Bristol Gordon England G.E.3
Bristol-Coanda Monoplanes
Bristol Coanda T.B.8
Bristol Coanda P.B.8
Bristol Scout
Caudron G.III
Deperdussin Type B
Dunne D.8
Henry Farman F.20
Grahame-White Type XV
London & Provincial 4
Lowe Marlburian
Nieuport IVG
Nieuport 10
Nieuport-Macchi Parasol
Radley-England Waterplane
Royal Aircraft Factory B.E.3
Royal Aircraft Factory B.E.4
Royal Aircraft Factory B.E.8
Royal Aircraft Factory B.S.1
Royal Aircraft Factory S.E.2
Royal Aircraft Factory S.E.2
Royal Aircraft Factory S.E.4
Short S.37
Short S.38
Short S.41
Short S.60
Short S.70
Sikorsky S-7
Sopwith Gordon Bennett Racer
Sopwith Pup
Sopwith Sociable
Sopwith Tabloid
Sopwith Three-Seater
Vickers No.8 Monoplane

Gnome 14 Lambda-Lambda

Avro 510
Royal Aircraft Factory S.E.4
Deperdussin Monocoque
Fokker D.III
Fokker E.IV
Paul Schmitt P.S.3
Short S.63
Short S.64
Short S.70
Short S.74
Short S.80
Short S.81
Short S.82

Survivors
An original Gnome 7 Lambda engine is installed in the Sopwith Tabloid replica aircraft on display in the Grahame-White hall of the Royal Air Force Museum London.

Specifications (Gnome 7 Lambda)

See also

References

Notes

Bibliography

 Lumsden, Alec. British Piston Engines and their Aircraft. Marlborough, Wiltshire: Airlife Publishing, 2003. .

Air-cooled aircraft piston engines
1910s aircraft piston engines
Lambda
Rotary aircraft piston engines